Mandeville Island is an island in the Sacramento–San Joaquin Delta located about  northwest of Stockton, in central California in the United States. The Connection Slough forms the island's southern end, and Sand Mound Slough borders the island to the north. The island lies directly to the east of Franks Tract State Recreation Area. It is in San Joaquin County, and managed by Reclamation District 2027.

See also
List of islands of California

External links

Islands of the Sacramento–San Joaquin River Delta
Islands of Northern California
Islands of San Joaquin County, California
Islands of California